Dermomurex pauperculus, common name the little aspella, is a species of sea snail, a marine gastropod mollusk in the family Muricidae, the murex snails or rock snails.

Description
The length of the shell varies between 12 mm and 30 mm.

Distribution
This species occurs in the Caribbean Sea and the Lesser Antilles; in the Atlantic Ocean from North Carolina to Brazil.

References

 Récluz, C., 1853. Description de coquilles nouvelles (Genres Turbo, Triton et Mitra). Journal de Conchyliologie 4: 245-249
 Fischer-Piette, E., 1950. - Listes des types décrits dans le Journal de Conchyliologie et conservés dans la collection de ce journal. Journal de Conchyliologie 90: 8-23
 Rosenberg, G., F. Moretzsohn, and E. F. García. 2009. Gastropoda (Mollusca) of the Gulf of Mexico, Pp. 579–699 in Felder, D.L. and D.K. Camp (eds.), Gulf of Mexico–Origins, Waters, and Biota. Biodiversity. Texas A&M Press, College Station, Texas
 Merle D., Garrigues B. & Pointier J.-P. (2011) Fossil and Recent Muricidae of the world. Part Muricinae. Hackenheim: Conchbooks. 648 pp. page(s): 214

External links
 
 MNHN, Paris: syntype

Gastropods described in 1850
Dermomurex